Ezgi Güç-Arslan (born 23 March 1992) is a Turkish female volleyball player. She was part of the Turkey women's national volleyball team.

She participated in the 2013 FIVB Volleyball World Grand Prix.
On club level she played for GALATASARAY in 2013.

Clubs

References

External links
 Ezgi Arslan at the International Volleyball Federation
 

1992 births
Living people
Turkish women's volleyball players
Place of birth missing (living people)
Galatasaray S.K. (women's volleyball) players
20th-century Turkish sportswomen
21st-century Turkish sportswomen